The Krông Nô River is a river of Vietnam. It flows through Đắk Lắk Province for 156 kilometres and has a basin area of 3920 km².

References

Rivers of Đắk Lắk province
Rivers of Vietnam